Ellen Dahl (13 September 1886 – 17 February 1959) was a Danish writer and philanthropist. She was the younger sister of Karen Blixen.

Further reading
 Keller, Morten Vilhelm: Ellen Dahl - Mols og litteraturen. Aarhus Universitetsforlag (240 pages)

References 

Danish philanthropists
Danish women philanthropists
Danish women writers
Danish writers
20th-century Danish women landowners
20th-century Danish landowners
1886 births
1959 deaths
20th-century philanthropists
20th-century women philanthropists